The Women's University Club of Seattle is a social club for women located at 1105 Sixth Avenue in Seattle, Washington. The club's building was added to the National Register of Historic Places on July 10, 2009.

Notable Members
 Reah Whitehead
 Bertha Knight Landes
 Amy Aldrich Worth

Gallery

References

External links 
 Women's University Club of Seattle web page

Women's club buildings
Women's clubs in the United States
Clubhouses on the National Register of Historic Places in Washington (state)
Downtown Seattle
Buildings and structures in Seattle
National Register of Historic Places in Seattle
Colonial Revival architecture in Washington (state)
Buildings and structures completed in 1922
History of women in Washington (state)